"Super Chance" is the second single by 1986 Omega Tribe, released by VAP on August 7, 1986. The song peaked at No. 2 on the Oricon charts.

Background 
The single was the only single by 1986 Omega Tribe to be win 1st place in The Top Ten.
In commemoration for being in first place, The Best Ten released Carlos' favorite piranha tempura and the program Yoru no Hitto Sutajio (夜のヒットスタジオ) secretly invited Carlos to Japan. After that, Carlos talked to his parents by phone, and then he made a surprise project that Carlos appeared in front of Carlos.
The B-side "Navigator" is a single cut from the title song from the band's first album, Navigator. The music was produced by members who recorded for the first time in the single.

Track listing

Single

Charts

Weekly charts

Year-end charts

References 

Omega Tribe (Japanese band) songs
1986 songs